Emil Benedict Kush (November 4, 1916 – November 26, 1969) was an American professional baseball player, a right-handed pitcher who worked in 150 Major League games for the Chicago Cubs for six seasons (1941–42; 1946–49). He missed three seasons (1943–45) while serving in the United States Navy during World War II.

Kush enjoyed two banner back-to-back seasons in 1946 and 1947, appearing in 87 games and 220 innings pitched, winning 17 of a total of 22 decisions, collecting both of his career complete games and seven of his 12 saves. He posted a cumulative earned run average of 3.18 during those two years.

All told, Kush allowed 324 hits and 158 bases on balls in 346 MLB innings, with 150 strikeouts.

Kush died via carbon monoxide poisoning on November 26, 1969.

References

External links

1916 births
1969 suicides
United States Navy personnel of World War II
Chicago Cubs players
Los Angeles Angels (minor league) players
Major League Baseball pitchers
Milwaukee Brewers (minor league) players
Ponca City Angels players
Tulsa Oilers (baseball) players
Suicides by carbon monoxide poisoning
Baseball players from Chicago
Suicides in Illinois
United States Navy sailors